Irish Jasper is an American thoroughbred racehorse who has eight wins, including multiple graded stakes races.

2015 season
She won the Grade III Victory Ride Stakes. This was Irish Jasper's third consecutive win, prompting her owner to enter her in the Grade I Test Stakes. The Test Stakes was her first Grade 1 race, and she finished fourth.

Irish Jasper also won the Grade III Miss Preakness Stakes.

2016 season
She won the Grade II Thoroughbred Club of America Stakes, earning a start in the Grade I 2016 Breeders' Cup Filly & Mare Sprint in which she would finish out of the money.

References

2012 racehorse births
Racehorses bred in Kentucky
Racehorses trained in the United States
Thoroughbred family 1-s